The following is a list of recurring Saturday Night Live characters and sketches introduced between October 3, 1981, and May 22, 1982, the seventh season of SNL.

Tyrone Green, Prose and Cons
An Eddie Murphy sketch. Debuted October 3, 1981.

A Few Minutes with Andy Rooney
A parody of the "A Few Minutes with Andy Rooney" segments on the newsmagazine TV program 60 Minutes with Joe Piscopo impersonating Andy Rooney. Debuted October 3, 1981.

Appearances

The Bizarro World
A parody of the world of the same name featured in DC Comics, the sketch features characters who all have big ears and speak with a vocoded effect on their voices and everyone does the complete opposite (e.g.: "Goodbye" is "Hello" and vice versa)

List of appearances:
 October 10, 1981 "Bizzaro President" (Host: Susan St. James)
 February 20, 1982 "Bizarro Broadcasting Company" (Host: Bruce Dern)

Buckwheat
The Our Gang character of Buckwheat, portrayed as an adult by Eddie Murphy, sang current hits in garbled speech. His first appearance, on October 10, 1981, was in a commercial parody for an album titled, Buh-Weet Sings. Right before each song, subtitles on the screen would list the name, spelled phonetically exactly as Buckwheat would say it (example: "Lookin' for Love" became "Wookin' Pa Nub" and "Three Times a Lady" became "Fee Tines a Mady"). One song, "Bette Davis Eyes" is so poorly pronounced that the superimposed title is "???". Those who wanted to purchase the album were instructed to send money to "Bah Firty Fee, New Nork, New Nork".

The character was also the central focus of a series of sketches called "Who Shot Buckwheat?", which parodied the then-recent TV coverage of assassinations and attempted assassinations of public figures, such as the attempted assassination of President Ronald Reagan and the murder of John Lennon, as well as the "Who Shot J.R.?" storyline on the television series Dallas.

Appearances

Paulette Clooney
A Robin Duke sketch. Debuted October 10, 1981.

Appearances

Velvet Jones
Eddie Murphy plays an entrepreneurial pimp and author of the book "I Wanna Be A Ho".

Debuted on October 17, 1981.

Appearances

Vic Salukin
A Tony Rosato sketch. Debuted October 31, 1981.

Pudge & Solomon
In this 1980s sketch, two grizzled barflies were played by Joe Piscopo and Eddie Murphy.  Piscopo's character played the piano. Debuted January 30, 1982.

Appearances

Dr. Jack Badofsky
Dr. Jack Badofsky was played by Tim Kazurinsky in a series of appearances on SNL Newsbreak or Saturday Night News (the monikers for Weekend Update during the Ebersol years). The doctor would inform the audience about different strains of diseases like influenza or rabies, and each strain would be a rhyming pun (i.e. "Should you be bitten by an ownerless dog, that’s Straybies, and a foaming French poodle can give you Qu'est-ce Que-C'estbies"). Badofsky stuttered in a timid, wavering tone, suggesting the sort of "ultra uptight" and extremely introverted character he was supposed to be, when thrust into the spotlight. There is, indeed, a real Jack Badofsky. He collaborated with Kazurinsky in writing the sketches and—as a nod to Badofsky—Kazurinsky named the character after him. At the time, Badofsky headed up Smith, Badofsky & Raffel, a Chicago ad agency known for Badofsky's humorous radio commercials. Badofsky also has written many essays and humor for newspapers and magazines as well a material performed on the stage and TV.

Appearances

Gumby
Eddie Murphy impersonates the green clay character Gumby. Debuted March 27, 1982. This was the origin of the catch-phrase "I'm Gumby, dammit!", which has been called one of the show's "best catchphrases".

Appearances

The Whiners
Joe Piscopo, playing Doug Whiner, and Robin Duke, playing Wendy Whiner, speak all their lines in a whining, nasal tone, hence, a double meaning of their name. They both claim to suffer from diverticulitis, and neither eats anything but macaroni and cheese.

In 1998, writer Stanley Ribbles, in a Turner-Allan magazine article, said this of "The Whiners":

Appearances

References

Lists of recurring Saturday Night Live characters and sketches
Saturday Night Live
Saturday Night Live
Saturday Night Live in the 1980s